The Massachusetts Open is the Massachusetts state open golf tournament, open to both amateur and professional golfers. It is organized by Mass Golf (formerly the Massachusetts Golf Association). It has been played annually since 1905 (except for war years and 2020) at a variety of courses around the state. It was considered a PGA Tour event from 1916 to 1937. Past winners include World Golf Hall of Fame players Donald Ross, Walter Hagen, Leo Diegel, Francis Ouimet, Gene Sarazen, Byron Nelson, Horton Smith, and Julius Boros.

In 2008 and 2009, two future PGA Tour players won the event. Jim Renner won the event in 2008 at Stockbridge Golf Club and Rob Oppenheim won the event in 2009 at Belmont Country Club.

Winners

Clubs to host three or more times

References

External links
Mass Golf
List of winners

1905 establishments in Massachusetts
Cancelled sports events
Former PGA Tour events
Golf in Massachusetts
Recurring sporting events established in 1905
Sports competitions in Massachusetts
State Open golf tournaments